Philippi Glacier is a glacier flowing east into Brandt Cove on the southwest side of Drygalski Fjord, at the southeast end of South Georgia. Charted by the German Antarctic Expedition, 1911–12, under Wilhelm Filchner, who named it for Emil Philippi, glaciologist with the German Antarctic Expedition, 1901–03, under Erich von Drygalski, and professor of geology at the University of Jena.

See also
 List of glaciers in the Antarctic
 Glaciology

Glaciers of South Georgia